Bush tucker, also called bush food, is any food native to Australia and used as sustenance by Indigenous Australians, the Aboriginal and Torres Strait Islander peoples, but it can also describe any native flora or fauna used for culinary or medicinal purposes, regardless of the continent or culture. Animal native foods include kangaroo, emu, witchetty grubs and crocodile, and plant foods include fruits such as quandong, kutjera, spices such as lemon myrtle and vegetables such as warrigal greens and various native yams.

Traditional Indigenous Australians' use of bushfoods has been severely affected by the settlement of Australia in 1788 and subsequent settlement by non-Indigenous peoples. The introduction of non-native foods, together with the loss of traditional lands, resulting in reduced access to native foods by Aboriginal people, and destruction of native habitat for agriculture, has accentuated the reduction in use.

Since the 1970s, there has been recognition of the nutritional and gourmet value of native foods by non-Indigenous Australians, and the bushfood industry has grown enormously. Kangaroo meat has been available in supermarkets since the 1980s, and many other foods are sold in restaurants or packaged as gourmet foods, which has led to expansion of commercial cultivation of native food crops.

History
Aboriginal Australians have eaten native animal and plant foods for an estimated 60,000 years of human habitation on the Australian continent, using various traditional methods of processing and cooking. An estimated 5,000 species of native food were used by Aboriginal peoples. With much of it unsafe or unpalatable raw, a variety of methods were employed to render the various foods edible, such as cooking on open fires (meat) or boiling in bark containers. They would pound vegetables and seeds, or hang them in bags in running water.

Colonisation

Bush tucker provided a source of nutrition to the non-indigenous colonial settlers, often supplementing meagre rations.  However, bushfoods were often considered to be inferior by colonists unfamiliar with the new land's food ingredients, generally preferring familiar foods from their homelands.

Especially in the more densely colonised areas of south-eastern Australia, the introduction of non-native foods to Aboriginal people resulted in an almost complete abandonment of native foods by them. This impact on traditional foods was further accentuated by the loss of traditional lands, which has resulted in reduced access to native foods by Aboriginal people, and destruction of native habitat for agriculture.

The 19th century English botanist, Joseph Dalton Hooker, writing of Australian plants in Flora of Tasmania, remarked although "eatable," are not "fit to eat". In 1889, botanist Joseph Maiden reiterated this sentiment with the comment on native food plants "nothing to boast of as eatables." The first monograph to be published on the flora of Australia reported the lack of edible plants on the first page, where it presented Billardiera scandens as, "... almost the only wild eatable fruit of the country".

Modern use

Apart from the macadamia nut, with the first small-scale commercial plantation being planted in Australia in the 1880s, no native food plants were produced commercially until the 1990s. The macadamia was the only Australian native plant food developed and cropped on a large scale, but Hawaii was where the macadamia was commercially developed to its greatest extent, from stock imported from Australia.

From the 1970s non-Indigenous Australians began to recognise the previously overlooked native Australian foods. Textbooks such as Wildfoods in Australia (1981) by the botanist couple Alan and Joan Cribb were popular. In the late 1970s horticulturists started to assess native food-plants for commercial use and cultivation.

In 1980 South Australia legalised the sale of kangaroo meat for human consumption, and it is now commonly found in supermarkets and prized for its nutritional value as a lean meat. Analysis shows that a variety of bushfoods are exceptionally nutritious. In the mid-1980s, several Sydney restaurants began using native Australian ingredients in recipes more familiar to non-Indigenous tastes – providing the first opportunity for bushfoods to be tried by non-Indigenous Australians on a serious gourmet level. This led to the realisation that many strongly flavoured native food plants have spice-like qualities.

Following popular TV programs on "bush tucker", a surge in interest in the late 1980s saw the publication of books like Bushfood: Aboriginal Food and Herbal Medicine by Jennifer Isaacs, The Bushfood Handbook and Uniquely Australian by Vic Cherikoff, and Wild Food Plants of Australia by Tim Low. 

An advantage of growing the native foods is that they are well adapted to Australia's environment, in particular at the extreme ends, they are ecologically sound. Bush tucker ingredients were initially harvested from the wild, but cultivated sources have become increasingly important to provide sustainable supplies for a growing market, with some Aboriginal communities also involved in the supply chain. However, despite the industry being founded on Aboriginal knowledge of the plants, Aboriginal participation in the commercial sale of bush tucker is currently still marginal, and mostly at the supply end of value chains.  Organisations are working to increase Aboriginal participation in the bush tucker market.  Gourmet style processed food and dried food have been developed for the domestic and export markets.

The term "bushfood" is one of several terms describing native Australian food, evolving from the older-style "bush tucker" which was used in the 1970s and 1980s.

In the 21st century, many restaurants are serving emu, crocodile, yabbies and locally sourced eels, and using native plant spices for flavour. Producers have sprung up across the country to serve the new markets, including Tasmanian pepper, Victorian eel farms and South Australian plantations of quandongs, bush tomatoes, and native citrus.

In 2020, researchers at the University of Queensland were researching a fruit native to Arnhem Land in the Northern Territory, Buchanania obovata, known as the green plum. Eaten for more than 53,000 years but previously little-known among non-Indigenous people, the scientists learnt about the plum from people at the remote community of Yirrkala. It is harvested some time after the Kakadu plum harvests. Nutritional analysis showed high levels of protein, dietary fibre and the minerals potassium, phosphorus and magnesium. In addition, the folate level is among the highest of commercially available fruits. Its potential as a commercial crop for Indigenous communities is being investigated.

Types of foods

Toxic seeds, such as Cycas media and Moreton Bay chestnut, are processed to remove the toxins and render them safe to eat. Many foods are also baked in the hot campfire coals, or baked for several hours in ground ovens. "Paperbark", the bark of Melaleuca species, is widely used for wrapping food placed in ground ovens. Bush bread such as "Johnny cakes" were made by males using many types of seeds, nuts and corns to process a flour or dough. Some animals such as kangaroos, were cooked in their own skin and others such as turtles, were cooked in their own shells.

Kangaroo is quite common and can be found in Australian supermarkets, often cheaper than beef. Other animals, for example  jimba, emu, goanna and witchetty grubs, are eaten by Aboriginal Australians. Fish and shellfish are culinary features of the Australian coastal communities.

Examples of Australian native plant foods include the fruits quandong, kutjera, muntries, riberry, Davidson's plum, and finger lime. Native spices include lemon myrtle, mountain pepper, and the kakadu plum. Various native yams are valued as food, and a popular leafy vegetable is warrigal greens. Nuts include bunya nut, and, the most identifiable bush tucker plant harvested and sold in large-scale commercial quantities, is the macadamia nut. Knowledge of Aboriginal uses of fungi is meagre, but beefsteak fungus and native "bread" (a fungus also), were certainly eaten.

Native Australian food-plants listed by culinary province and plant part

Australian bush tucker plants can be divided into several distinct and large regional culinary provinces. Some species listed grow across several climatic boundaries.

{|
|-
|Adansonia gregorii||boab
|-
|Buchanania arborescens||sparrow's mango
|-
|Citrus gracilisrry
|-
|Ficus racemosa||cluster fig
|-
|Manilkara kauki||wongi
|-
|Melastoma affine||blue tongue
|-
|Mimusops elengi||tanjong
|-
|Morinda citrifolia||great morinda
|-
|Physalis minima||native gooseberry
|-
|Terminalia ferdinandiana||kakadu plum
|-
|Syzygium erythrocalyx||Johnstone's River satinash
|-
|Syzygium fibrosum||fibrous satinash
|-
|Syzygium suborbiculare||lady apple
|}

 Vegetables 

 Nuts 

 Spices 

Outback Australia
Arid and semi-arid zones of the low rainfall interior.

Fruits

Vegetables

Seeds

Spices

Insects in gall

Bush coconut
Mulga apple

Eastern Australia
Subtropical rainforests of New South Wales to the wet tropics of Northern Queensland.

Fruit

Vegetable

Spices

Nut

Temperate Australia
Warm and cool temperate zones of southern Australia, including Tasmania, South Australia, Victoria and the highlands of New South Wales.

Tasmania

Fruit

Seed

Spice

Vegetable

Leaf

In the media
TV shows made use of the bush tucker theme. Malcolm Douglas was one of the first presenters to show how to 'live off the land' in the Australian Outback. Major Les Hiddins, a retired Australian Army soldier popularised the idea of bush tucker as an interesting food resource. He presented a hit TV series called The Bush Tucker Man on the ABC TV network in the late 1980s. In the series, Hiddins demonstrated his research for NORFORCE in identifying foods which might sustain or augment army forces in the northern Australian Outback. 'NORFORCE' is a Regional Force Surveillance Unit of the Australian Army Reserve.

Starting in 2002, I'm A Celebrity... Get Me Out of Here! became notorious for its "Bushtucker Trials", some of which involved eating meat based bush tucker (such as mealworms, locusts and kangaroo testicles) to win meals for the camp.

In early 2003, the first cooking show featuring authentic Australian foods and called Dining Downunder was produced by Vic Cherikoff and Bailey Park Productions of Toronto, Canada. This was followed by the Special Broadcasting Service (SBS) production of Message Stick with Aboriginal chef, Mark Olive.

In 2008 Ray Mears made a survival television series called Ray Mears Goes Walkabout, which focused on the history of survival in Australia with a focus on bush tucker.  In the series, Les Hiddins was a guest in one episode, with the two men sharing their knowledge and discussing various aspects of bush tucker.

In the TV survival series Survivorman, host and narrator Les Stroud spent time in the Australian outback.  After successfully finding and eating a witchetty grub raw he found many more and cooked them, stating they were much better cooked.  After cooking in hot embers of his fire, he removed the head and the hind of the grub and squeezed out thick yellow liquid before eating.

The SBS documentary series Food Safari featured bush tucker in an episode that went to air in 2013.

See also

Australian Aboriginal sweet foods
Australian cuisine
Bush bread
Bushfood industry history
Bushmeat
Bush medicine
Damper
Indigenous Australian food groups
Country food, equivalent term in Canada used to refer to food eaten by the Indigenous peoples of Canada

References

Footnotes

Sources
 Bruneteau, Jean-Paul, Tukka, Real Australian Food, .
 Cherikoff, Vic, The Bushfood Handbook, .
 Isaacs, Jennifer, Bushfood, Weldons, Sydney.
 Kersh, Jennice and Raymond, Edna's Table, .
 Low, Tim, Wild Food Plants of Australia'',

Further reading
 (Supersedes Australian Bushfoods magazine site)

 Long abstract; full text available on request.
  
  Bush Bean (Wakalpirri) and Bush Plum.

 

 
Australian cuisine
Flora of Australia
Australian Aboriginal bushcraft
Indigenous cuisine
Foraging
Fauna of Australia